Comment spam is a term referencing a broad category of spambot or spammer postings which abuse web-based forms to post unsolicited advertisements as comments on forums, blogs, wikis and online guestbooks. Related topics include:
 Forum spam, posts on Internet forums that contains related or unrelated advertisements, links to malicious websites, and abusive or otherwise unwanted information
 Newsgroup spam, a type of spam where the targets are Usenet newsgroups
 Social spam, unwanted spam content appearing on social networks and any website with user-generated content
 Spam in blogs, a form of spamdexing done by posting random comments, copied material, or promotion of commercial services
 Troll (Internet), a person who sows discord on the Internet
 Hit-and-run posting, a tactic where a poster at an Internet forum enters, makes a post, only to disappear immediately after
 Sockpuppet (Internet), an online identity used for purposes of deception
 Astroturfing, the practice of masking the sponsors of a message or organization

See also 
 Comment (disambiguation)
 State-sponsored Internet sockpuppetry

Spamming